The Alpecin–Deceuninck Development Team is a Belgian UCI Continental cycling team that was founded in 2021. It acts as the development 
program for UCI WorldTeam .

Team roster

Major wins
2021
 Stage 5 Tour of Bulgaria, Timo Kielich
2022
 Stage 1 Alpes Isère Tour, Henri Uhlig
  Overall Course de Solidarność et des Champions Olympiques,  Timo Kielich
Stage 1b, Simon Dehairs
Stage 2, Timo Kielich

References

External links

UCI Continental Teams (Europe)
Cycling teams based in Belgium
Cycling teams established in 2021
Alpecin–Fenix